The following list of Alpha Delta Phi members includes initiated and honorary members of Alpha Delta Phi.

Notable alumni

Art and architecture

Athletics

Business and finance

Clergy

Diplomacy

Education

Entertainment

Law and judiciary

Literature and journalism

Military

Politicians

Science and engineering

See also

References

Alpha Delta Phi
members